Athletics at the 1955 Mediterranean Games were held in Barcelona, Spain.

Results

Track

Field

Medal table

Participating nations

References

External links
Complete 1955 Mediterranean Games Standings.

Med
Athletics
1955